The Humberside Police and Crime Commissioner is the police and crime commissioner, an elected official tasked with setting out the way crime is tackled by Humberside Police in the English Counties of East Riding of Yorkshire and Northern parts of Lincolnshire. The post was created in November 2012, following an election held on 15 November 2012, and replaced the Humberside Police Authority. The current incumbent is Jonathan Evison, who represents the Conservative Party.

List of Humberside Police and Crime Commissioners

References

Police and crime commissioners in England